The 1965–66 National Football League was the 35th staging of the National Football League (NFL), an annual Gaelic football tournament for the Gaelic Athletic Association county teams of Ireland.

Longford won their first and (so far) only NFL title with wins over Galway in the "home" final and New York in the two-legged "World Championship." Longford had the first leg at Pearse Park and won easily. After the second leg, an angry crowd chased the New York team off the field due to their (perceived) rough play.

Format

Divisions
 Division I: 8 team. Split into two groups of four
 Division II: 8 teams. Split into two groups of four
 Division III: 8 teams. Split into two groups of four
 Division IV: 8 teams. Split into two groups of four

Group stages

Division I (Dr Lagan Cup)

Group B play-off

Inter-group play-offs

Group A

Group B

Division II

Inter-group play-offs

Group A

Group B

Division III

Inter-group play-offs

Tables

Group A

Group B

Division IV

Group B play-off

Inter-group play-offs

Group A

Group B

Knockout stages

Semi-finals

Home Final

Final

Longford win 21–17 on aggregate.

References

National Football League
National Football League
National Football League (Ireland) seasons